Saul Mkhize (6 June 1935 – 2 April 1983) was a South African human rights activist and representative for the people of Driefontein, Mpumalanga who were fighting against forceful removals from their land by the apartheid government. Mkhize was shot down by the police while organising a peaceful march.

References

1935 births
1983 deaths
People from Johannesburg